Contrasts (Sz. 111, BB 116) is a 1938 composition scored for clarinet-violin-piano trio by Béla Bartók (1881–1945). It is based on Hungarian and Romanian dance melodies and has three movements with a combined duration of 17–20 minutes. Bartók wrote the work in response to a letter from violinist Joseph Szigeti, although it was officially commissioned by clarinetist Benny Goodman.

Structure
The work is in three movements:
Verbunkos (Recruiting Dance)
Pihenő (Relaxation)
Sebes (Fast Dance)

The movements contrast in tempo. The first movement contains a cadenza for clarinet and the last one for violin. The piece features examples of alternate or dual-thirds (C and C in an A triad):

This mixed thirds structure may be thought of as bitonal in that the major and minor third of a triad are used. This structure may be extended through considering each third of the original triad as also being a possible third in a triad a half step in either direction. Thus C/D is a major third in an A major triad and the minor third of a B major triad:

Various Hungarian and Romanian dance melodies are incorporated into the work. The first movement begins with a lively violin pizzicato, after which the clarinet introduces the main theme, which is then varied. This theme is an example of the Hungarian dance and music genre "verbunkos", or recruiting dance. The genre of music was commonly played at military recruitings. The second movement is much more introspective and has a continuously shifting mood without a defined theme. The third is a frenzied dance that begins with a scordatura (G-D-A-E) violin section, after which the clarinet introduces the main theme. In the middle, there is a slower section in the time signature , after which the pattern of variations on the theme is resumed.

János Kárpáti has discussed the structural aspects of Contrasts in detail. Szigeti recalled that Bartók had told him that the start of Contrasts had partial inspiration from the "Blues" second movement of Maurice Ravel's Sonata for Violin and Piano.  F. Bónis has further noted the parallel between a short passage in the same Ravel movement and a passage in the first movement of Contrasts.

Movements

1. Verbunkos
"Verbunkos" features polymodality or what Kárpáti terms alternative structures. For example, the framing motif of the first movement features, in relation to the root, A, the minor and major third and the perfect and diminished fifth:

E is revealed as both an alternative fifth of an A chord and the alternative third of a C chord by the canon at the third at the beginning of the development, bar 58:

Between the six notes of both triads are seven thirds.

Verbunkos was a stately and stylized Hungarian Recruiting Dance "measured in rhythm and rich in melodic embellishments characterized by the theme":

2. Pihenő
This movement has been described as volcanic rather than relaxing, despite its title, "relaxation" or "rest".

3. Sebes
The violinist must retune (scordatura) two strings for the last movement, lowering the E and raising the G a semitone each.

The trio of this movement features "Bulgarian Rhythm"  and is similar in spirit to the Finale of the first Violin Sonata:

Reception
The work is said by Kárpáti to have "technical bravura and at the same time...poetic versatility". In contrast, E.R., assumes that appreciation of the work suffers from its "lack of variety of mood" though "Bartók's genius consists in gifts of rhetoric so rich that he can spread this one mood, and spread it interestingly, over a score or more of large-scale works". He argues that the "contrasts" in the piece are "of speed rather than of mood."

Seiber  considers it "a less weighty, less important work in Bartók's whole œuvre" though  the "writing for both violin and clarinet" is "most effective throughout". An article describing a program in which "the standard note on Bartók's Contrasts...was replaced by a sequential, diagrammatic sketch," concluded that, "in fact, Bartók looks as inscrutable as he sounds".

References

Sources

Bradshaw, Susan (2001). "Piano music: recital repertoire and chamber music", Cambridge Companion to Bartók, p. 116. Amanda Bayley, ed. .
 Centenrio Belae Bartók Sacrum#.
E. R. (1943) ."Review: Contrasts, for Violin, Clarinet and Piano by Béla Bartók", Music & Letters, Vol. 24, No. 1. (January 1943), p. 61.
Seiber, Mátyás (1949). "Béla Bartók's Chamber Music", Tempo, New Ser., No. 13, Bartók Number. (Autumn, 1949), pp. 19–31.

Further reading
"Program Notes: Better Unwritten than Unread", Music Educators Journal, Vol. 54, No. 7. (Mar., 1968), pp. 96–97. Features a listening score for Contrasts.
 Kárpáti, János. Bartók's Chamber Music. Stuyvesant, NY: Pendragon Press (1976).

External links
ET's Clarinet Studio: Contrasts by Bela Bartok by Eric Tishkoff
Sierra Chamber Society Program Notes: Contrasts by Joseph Way
Luna Nova Music Ensemble podcasts: Contrasts or http://www.lunanova.org/pod.html
Aurelius Ensemble - Bartók: Contrasts
Contrasts for Clarinet, Violin & Piano (Mvt I + II) performed by Yehudi Menuhin, Thea King, and Jeremy Menuhin
Contrasts for Clarinet, Violin & Piano (Mvt III)
Composer's Datebook, Public Radio International, January 8-14, 2007
Notes to Naxos recording, 8.550749
 

Chamber music by Béla Bartók
Bartok
Bartok
1938 compositions